Anolis bonairensis, the Bonaire anole or Ruthven's anole, is a species of lizard in the family Dactyloidae. The species is found in Bonaire and in Las Aves Archipelago, Venezuela,

References

Anoles
Lizards of the Caribbean
Reptiles of Bonaire
Reptiles of Venezuela
Reptiles described in 1923
Taxa named by Alexander Grant Ruthven